On View at the Five Spot Cafe is a live album by American jazz guitarist Kenny Burrell with drummer Art Blakey. It was recorded live at the Five Spot Café in New York City on August 25, 1959, and released on the Blue Note label.

English jazz guitarist Andy Summers referred to Burrell's solo on "Lover Man" as "one of the best jazz guitar solos ever recorded."

Reception
The Allmusic review by Michael G. Nastos awarded the album 3½ stars stating "As the dawn of the 1960s saw new-breed jazz being fomented, Burrell, Blakey, and company proved you could still swing and remain melodic while creating new sonic vistas. This recording is easily recommended to all".

Track listing
Original listing:
 "Birks' Works" (Dizzy Gillespie) - 9:15
 "Hallelujah" (Clifford Grey, Leo Robin, Vincent Youmans) - 11:43
 "Lady Be Good" (George Gershwin, Ira Gershwin) - 8:15
 "Lover Man" (Jimmy Davis, Ram Ramirez, James Sherman) - 9:48
 "36-23-36" (Kenny Burrell) - 3:35

CD reissue listing:
 "Birks' Works" (Dizzy Gillespie) - 9:15
 "Hackensack (T. Monk-C. Hawkins) on the chords of [Oh, Lady Be Good!]" ([George Gershwin]) - 8:15
 "Lover Man" (Jimmy Davis, Ram Ramirez, James Sherman) - 9:48
 "Swingin'" (Clifford Brown) - 9:48 Bonus track on CD reissue
 "Hallelujah" (Clifford Grey, Leo Robin, Vincent Youmans) - 11:43
 "Beef Stew Blues" (Randy Weston) - 4:32 Bonus track on CD reissue
 "If You Could See Me Now" (Tadd Dameron, Carl Sigman) - 5:25 Bonus track on CD reissue
 "36-23-36" (Kenny Burrell) - 3:35

Personnel
Kenny Burrell - guitar
Tina Brooks - tenor saxophone (tracks 1–2, 4)
Bobby Timmons - piano (tracks 1-4)
Roland Hanna - piano (tracks 5-8)
Ben Tucker - bass
Art Blakey - drums

References

Blue Note Records live albums
Kenny Burrell live albums
Art Blakey live albums
1959 live albums
Albums produced by Alfred Lion
Albums recorded at the Five Spot Café